The 1981 Arizona Wildcats football team represented the University of Arizona in the Pacific-10 Conference (Pac-10) during the 1981 NCAA Division I-A football season.  In their second season under head coach Larry Smith, the Wildcats compiled a 6–5 record (4–4 against Pac-10 opponents), finished in a tie for sixth place in the Pac-10, and outscored their opponents, 253 to 205.  The team played its home games in Arizona Stadium in Tucson, Arizona.

A memorable highlight of the season occurred in October when Arizona upset #1 USC, which was Arizona's first win over a top-ranked opponent in school history. It was also the Wildcats’ first win over the Trojans in program history. Losses to Fresno State and rival Arizona State were factors that prevented the Wildcats from going to a bowl game, although Arizona finished with a winning record (at the time, a 6–5 record didn’t always guarantee a bowl appearance due to very few bowls).

The team's statistical leaders included Tom Tunnicliffe with 1,420 passing yards, Vance Johnson with 654 rushing yards, and Bob Carter with 427 receiving yards. Linebacker Ricky Hunley led the team with 121 total tackles.

Before the season
Arizona finished the 1980 season (Smith’s first year with the Wildcats) with a 5–6 record, and featured the Wildcats’ upset victory over UCLA. The team entered 1981 with expectations that they would improve on their record, with fans believing that Smith was building a success with the program.

Schedule

Personnel

Game summaries

UCLA
In the home and season opener, the Wildcats hosted UCLA. Arizona upset the Bruins in the previous year that prevented UCLA from earning the top ranking. This time, UCLA (who was ranked 12th) got vengeance, and defeated the Wildcats to avenge the loss.

USC

Arizona visited top-ranked USC in the Wildcats’ first road game of the season. After the Trojans took an early 10–0 lead, the Wildcats scored 13 unanswered points to shock college football for a huge upset victory. It was Arizona's first win over a top-ranked team in program history and it was their biggest win since joining the Pac-10 in 1978. After returning to Tucson after the game, the team was met by a crowd of raucous fans for a wild celebration. It was the second straight year that Smith's Wildcats upset a top-5 team, as they defeated UCLA (the other Los Angeles school), who was ranked second at the time, in the previous season.

Arizona State

In the season finale, Arizona went to Tempe to face Arizona State (ranked 18th) in the rivalry game. On a rainy night, the Wildcats struggled and lost to ASU yet again, perhaps denying the Wildcats a chance to earn a bowl bid. Also, the loss extended ASU's dominance in the rivalry dating back to 1949, with the Wildcats losing for the 24th time in 33 meetings.

Season notes
 Arizona returned to wearing white helmets and blue jerseys at home full-time after previously donning red helmets and jerseys. They began wearing the helmets that featured a large red “A” on them. The team believed that wearing blue would distinguish themselves from several Pac-10 teams that wear red helmets and/or jerseys at home. The Wildcats would continue to wear the “Red ‘A’” helmets until the end of the 1989 season and began wearing helmets with the school’s current “Block ‘A’” logo on it in 1990.
 After this season, the Wildcats would not defeat a top-ranked opponent until 1992 when they would upset Washington.
 This season was the last in which Smith lost to Arizona State. The Wildcats would not lose to the Sun Devils again until 1991 (despite tying the 1987 contest), and started a reign of dominance over their rival that began the following season.
 The Wildcats’ loss to Arizona State was the only loss for Arizona on the road, and prevented a perfect road record, as Arizona's other four losses occurred at home.

References

Arizona
Arizona Wildcats football seasons
Arizona Wildcats football